This is a list of Billboard magazine's top 50 singles of 1957 according to retail sales.

See also
1957 in music

References

United States Year-end
Billboard charts